Ngerengere is a Tanzanian ward of Morogoro District in Morogoro Region. It is located south of the A7 trunk road that connects Dar es Salaam to Morogoro. It is named after the Ngerengere River. The Tanzanian Army's air force command maintains an airbase near the vicinity.

Footnotes

Populated places in Morogoro Region
Morogoro